The 2007 VCU Rams baseball team represented Virginia Commonwealth University during the 2007 NCAA Division I baseball season. The Rams played their home games at The Diamond as a member of the Colonial Athletic Association. They were led by head coach Paul Keyes, in his thirteenth year as head coach.

Previous season

The 2006 VCU Rams baseball team notched a 34–24 (18–11) regular-season record.

References 

2007 Colonial Athletic Association baseball season
2007
2007 in sports in Virginia
Vcu
2007